Railway stations in Buriram Province, Thailand (From West to East)

Buriram Province
Thailand transport-related lists
Buriram Province
Buildings and structures in Buriram province
Lists of buildings and structures in Thailand